The Canadian province of Prince Edward Island first required its residents to register their motor vehicles and display licence plates in 1913. Only rear plates have been required since 1976.

Passenger baseplates

1919 to 1961 
The first Prince Edward Island licence plate that complied with these standards was issued six years beforehand, in 1950.

1962 to present

Commercial plates

Non-passenger plates

Specialty Plates

Conservation plates
In 2013, the province introduced five new specialty plate designs. Those designs included; Blue jay, Canada goose, Red fox, Trout & Lady slipper, the provinces official flower. All profits go to the P.E.I. Wildlife Conservation Fund.

References

External links

Prince Edward Island licence plates, 1969–present

1913 establishments in Prince Edward Island
Prince Edward Island
Transport in Prince Edward Island
Prince Edward Island-related lists